Jaak Arro (born 19 June 1957 in Tallinn) is an Estonian stage artist and painter.

In 1984 he graduated from Estonian Art Institute in painting speciality. 1995-2003 he taught at Estonian Art Academy (since 1997 professor). He has been an artist for several animated films.

He is married to the painter Epp Maria Kokamägi.

Works

 1988 – "Papa Carlo teater" (scenarist, artist)
 1989 – "Noblesse oblige" (scenarist, artist)
 1993 – "Elutuba" (artist)

References

External links
 

Living people
1957 births
Estonian painters